Voivodeship road 110 (abbreviated DW 110) is a route in the Polish voivodeship roads network. The route links the Voivodeship Road 102 in Lędzin, Voivodeship Road 103 in Cerkwica with Voivodeship Road 109 and Voivodeship Road 105 in Gryfice. The route runs through Gryfice County with length 23 km.

Important settlements along the route

Lędzin
Karnice
Cerkwica
Przybiernówko
Gryfice

Route plan

References

110